Maja Chwalińska and Katarzyna Kawa were the defending champions, but chose not to participate.

Rebeka Masarova and Rebecca Šramková won the title, defeating Robin Anderson and Anhelina Kalinina in the final, 6–4, 3–6, [10–4].

Seeds

Draw

Draw

References
Main Draw

Bella Cup - Doubles